Atelopus hoogmoedi, also known by its common name Hoogmoed's harlequinfrog, is a species from the genus Atelopus. This species was originally described by Jean Lescure in 1974.

References

Sources

 
 
 
 
 
 
 

Taxa named by Jean Lescure
hoogmoedi
Amphibians described in 1974